Madison County Courthouse is a historic courthouse located at Madison, serving Madison County, Virginia. It was built in 1828, and is a two-story,  brick temple-form structure.  On the facade the ground floor becomes an open arcade four-bays wide and one-bay deep.  The gable roof is topped by a tall octagonal domed cupola.  The building features a Tuscan order entablature with Tuscan pediments at either end.

It was listed on the National Register of Historic Places in 1969.  It is located in the Madison County Courthouse Historic District.

References

External links

Madison County Courthouse, U.S. Route 29, Madison, Madison County, VA: 1 photo and 34 data pages at Historic American Buildings Survey

Historic American Buildings Survey in Virginia
Courthouses on the National Register of Historic Places in Virginia
County courthouses in Virginia
Government buildings completed in 1828
Buildings and structures in Madison County, Virginia
National Register of Historic Places in Madison County, Virginia
Individually listed contributing properties to historic districts on the National Register in Virginia